Norman Rond Hamilton (November 13, 1877 – March 26, 1964) was a U.S. Representative from Virginia.

Early and family life
Born in Portsmouth, Virginia, Hamilton attended the public and high schools.

Career 
Hamilton began his publishing career as a newspaper reporter in Norfolk (1895–1914).
He became publisher of the Portsmouth (Virginia) Star from 1917 until it merged with the Norfolk Ledger in 1955.

He became involved in the local Democratic Party . Hamilton became collector of customs for Virginia during the Wilson administration, and served from 1914 until 1922. Before the United States entered World War I, Hamilton became the port's neutrality enforcement officer. He then served as chairman of the Port War Board of Hampton Roads (1916–1918). Hamilton was a delegate to the Democratic National Conventions in 1924, 1928, 1932, 1952, and 1960.
He also served as Trustee of Virginia State Teachers' College in 1922–1926. During the Franklin D. Roosevelt administration, Hamilton, in 1933, Hamilton was appointed as receiver at Washington, D.C., of five District of Columbia insolvent banks, a position he resigned in June 1936 to run for Congress.

Hamilton defeated incumbent (and Byrd Organization loyalist) Colgate Darden in the Democratic primary, then won election to the seat in the general election. He thus served in the Seventy-fifth Congress (January 3, 1937 – January 3, 1939). However, Darden defeated his renomination attempt in 1938, and also failed to win election in 1941 to fill a vacancy in the Seventy-seventh Congress.
Executive of the Norfolk-Portsmouth Newspapers, Inc..

Death and legacy 
Hamilton died in Norfolk, Virginia, March 26, 1964.
He was interred in Oak Grove Cemetery, Portsmouth, Virginia.

Electoral history

1936
Hamilton was elected to the U.S. House of Representatives defeating Republican Gerould M. Rumble and Communist Alexander Wright, winning 88.68% of the vote.

Sources

1877 births
Democratic Party members of the United States House of Representatives from Virginia
1964 deaths
Politicians from Norfolk, Virginia
Politicians from Portsmouth, Virginia
20th-century American newspaper publishers (people)
American male journalists
Journalists from Virginia